This is a list of notable people related to the University of Birmingham.

Chancellors

The University of Birmingham has had seven chancellors since gaining its royal charter in 1900. Joseph Chamberlain, the first chancellor, was largely responsible for the university gaining its royal charter in 1900 and for the development of the Edgbaston campus.

Vice-chancellors and principals

 Sir Oliver Lodge, physicist, Principal of the University of Birmingham 1900-19
 Sir Charles Grant Robertson, British academic historian, Fellow of All Souls College, Oxford, Principal of the University of Birmingham 1920–1923, Vice-chancellor & Principal of the University of Birmingham 1923-1938
 Sir Raymond Priestley, geologist and early Antarctic explorer, Vice-chancellor & Principal of the University of Birmingham 1938-1952
 Humphrey Francis Humphreys, academic, Vice-chancellor & Principal of the University of Birmingham 1952-1953
 Sir Robert Aitken, Vice-chancellor & Principal of the University of Birmingham 1953–1968, helped set up the University of Warwick
 Lord Hunter of Newington, physician, Vice-chancellor & Principal of the University of Birmingham 1968-1981
 Edward Marsland, Vice-chancellor & Principal of the University of Birmingham 1982-1987
 Sir Michael Thompson, Vice-chancellor & Principal of the University of Birmingham 1987-1996
 Maxwell Irvine, theoretical physicist, Vice-chancellor & Principal of the University of Birmingham 1996-2001
 Sir Michael Sterling, Vice-chancellor & Principal of the University of Birmingham 2001-2009
 Sir David Eastwood, former Chief Executive at the Higher Education Funding Council for England (HEFCE), Vice-chancellor & Principal of the University of Birmingham 2009-2021
 Sir Adam Tickell, Vice-chancellor & Principal of the University of Birmingham 2022-

Academics

Alumni

Birmingham University OTC
 William Slim, 1st Viscount Slim, Field Marshal, member of Birmingham University Officers' Training Corps 1912–14

Birmingham University Air Squadron
 Sir John Aiken, Air Chief Marshal, became Officer Commanding Birmingham University Air Squadron in 1950

Others

 Sir Julian Bullard, British diplomat, Foreign Office Minister and Pro-Chancellor of Birmingham University
 Margery Fry, prison reformer and Principal of Somerville College, Oxford, first warden of University House, the first all-women university Hall of Residence in Britain
 Lord Hannay of Chiswick, British diplomat, Pro-Chancellor of Birmingham University 2001–06.
 James Marshall, member of the university clerical staff in the Faculty of Medicine, awarded the Victoria Cross for his part in the attack on the Sambre–Oise Canal in World War One on 4 November 1918
 Jonathan Nicholls, Registrar of Birmingham University

References

University of Birmingham

Birmingham